Lemp may refer to:

Lemp (Dill), a river in Hesse, Germany
Lemp family, brewers in St. Louis, Missouri, and places named after them:
Lemp Mansion
Lemp Neighborhood Arts Center
 Duncan Lemp Shooting victim in 2020 police raid on his residence in Montgomery County, Maryland
Rebecca Lemp (d. 1590), German woman accused of witchcraft and burned at the stake
Fritz-Julius Lemp (1913–1941), U-boat commander during World War II
LEMP: Lightning  Electromagnetic Pulse, see Electromagnetic_compatibility#Pulse_or_transient_interference
LEMP software stack, a variation on the LAMP software bundle that uses Nginx rather than Apache HTTP Server, also known as LNMP